State Game Lands No. 256 consists of 1,254 acres, located in Perry County east of New Bloomfield, Pennsylvania, United States. The terrain is gently rolling woodland broken by numerous small drainages. The most common game species found here are deer, wild turkey, grouse, and eastern gray squirrel.

References 

256
Protected areas of Perry County, Pennsylvania